Al Uqsur (Arabic for "the fortified"), may refer to:
 Luxor
 Al Uqsur Governorate